In combinatorial mathematics, an alternating permutation (or zigzag permutation) of the set {1, 2, 3, ..., n} is a permutation (arrangement) of those numbers so that each entry is alternately greater or less than the preceding entry.  For example, the five alternating permutations of {1, 2, 3, 4} are:
 1, 3, 2, 4        because       1 < 3 > 2 < 4,
 1, 4, 2, 3        because       1 < 4 > 2 < 3,
 2, 3, 1, 4        because       2 < 3 > 1 < 4,
 2, 4, 1, 3        because       2 < 4 > 1 < 3, and
 3, 4, 1, 2        because       3 < 4 > 1 < 2.
This type of permutation was first studied by Désiré André in the 19th century.

Different authors use the term alternating permutation slightly differently: some require that the second entry in an alternating permutation should be larger than the first (as in the examples above), others require that the alternation should be reversed (so that the second entry is smaller than the first, then the third larger than the second, and so on), while others call both types by the name alternating permutation.

The determination of the number An of alternating permutations of the set {1, ..., n} is called André's problem. The numbers An are known as Euler numbers, zigzag numbers, or up/down numbers.  When n is even the number An is known as a secant number, while if n is odd it is known as a tangent number.  These latter names come from the study of the generating function for the sequence.

Definitions

A permutation  is said to be alternating if its entries alternately rise and descend. Thus, each entry other than the first and the last should be either larger or smaller than both of its neighbors. Other authors reverse this convention, or use the word "alternating" to refer to both up-down and down-up permutations.

There is a simple one-to-one correspondence between the down-up and up-down permutations: replacing each entry  with  reverses the relative order of the entries.

By convention, in any naming scheme the unique permutations of length 0 (the permutation of the empty set) and 1 (the permutation consisting of a single entry 1) are taken to be alternating.

André's theorem 

The determination of the number An of alternating permutations of the set {1, ..., n} is called André's problem.  The numbers An are variously known as Euler numbers, zigzag numbers, up/down numbers, or by some combinations of these names.  The name Euler numbers in particular is sometimes used for a closely related sequence. The first few values of An are 1, 1, 1, 2, 5, 16, 61, 272, 1385, 7936, 50521, ... .

These numbers satisfy a simple recurrence, similar to that of the Catalan numbers: by splitting the set of alternating permutations (both down-up and up-down) of the set { 1, 2, 3, ..., n, n + 1 } according to the position k of the largest entry , one can show that

 

for all .   used this recurrence to give a differential equation satisfied by the exponential generating function

 

for the sequence .  In fact, the recurrence gives:

This gives the integral equation

which after differentiation becomes .
This differential equation can be solved by separation of variables (using the initial condition ), and simplified using a tangent half-angle formula, giving the final result

 ,

the sum of the secant and tangent functions.  This result is known as André's theorem.

It follows from André's theorem that the radius of convergence of the series  is /2.  This allows one to compute the asymptotic expansion

Related integer sequences

The odd-indexed zigzag numbers (i.e., the tangent numbers) are closely related to Bernoulli numbers.  The relation is given by the formula

 

for n > 0.

If Zn denotes the number of permutations of {1, ..., n} that are either up-down or down-up (or both, for n < 2) then it follows from the pairing given above that Zn = 2An for n ≥ 2. The first few values of Zn are 1, 1, 2, 4, 10, 32, 122, 544, 2770, 15872, 101042, ... .

The Euler zigzag numbers are related to Entringer numbers, from which the zigzag numbers may be computed.  The Entringer numbers can be defined recursively as follows:
 
 
 .
The nth zigzag number is equal to the Entringer number E(n, n).

The first few values are 1, 1, 5, 61, 1385,  50521, ...  .

Secant numbers are related to the signed Euler numbers (Taylor coefficients of hyperbolic secant) by the formula E2n = (−1)nA2n. (En = 0 when n is odd.)

Correspondingly, the numbers A2n+1 with odd indices are called tangent numbers or zag numbers. The first few values are 1, 2, 16, 272, 7936, ...  .

Explicit formula in terms of Stirling numbers of the second kind
The relationships of Euler zigzag numbers with the Euler numbers, and the Bernoulli numbers can be used to prove the following

where 

 denotes the rising factorial, and  denotes Stirling numbers of the second kind.

See also
 Longest alternating subsequence
 Boustrophedon transform
 Fence (mathematics), a partially ordered set that has alternating permutations as its linear extensions

Citations

References 

.

.

 .

External links
 
 Ross Tang, "An Explicit Formula for the Euler zigzag numbers (Up/down numbers) from power series" A simple explicit formula for An.
 "A Survey of Alternating Permutations", a preprint by Richard P. Stanley

Permutations
Enumerative combinatorics